Elachista leifi is a moth of the family Elachistidae. It is found in northern Finland.

The larvae possibly feed on Carex and/or Eriophorum vaginatum. They mine the leaves of their host plant.

References

leifi
Moths described in 1992
Endemic fauna of Finland
Moths of Europe